Future Generation Computer Systems is a monthly peer-reviewed scientific journal covering all aspects of computer engineering. It is published by Elsevier and the editor-in-chief is Michela Taufer (University of Tennessee). According to the Journal Citation Reports, the journal had a 2019 impact factor of 7.187.

References

External links

Computer science journals
English-language journals
Monthly journals
Elsevier academic journals
Publications with year of establishment missing